is a Japanese former long-distance runner, who won the silver medal in the women's marathon at the 1991 World Championships in Athletics in Tokyo.

Achievements

References
ARRS

1964 births
Living people
Japanese female long-distance runners
Athletes (track and field) at the 1992 Summer Olympics
Olympic athletes of Japan
Olympic female marathon runners
Place of birth missing (living people)
World Athletics Championships medalists
Japanese female marathon runners
20th-century Japanese women
21st-century Japanese women